is a private women's university in Satsumasendai, Kagoshima, Japan. The predecessor of the school was founded in 1933, and it was chartered as a junior university in 1961. In 1994, it became a four-year college and adopted the present name.

External links
 Official website

Educational institutions established in 1933
Private universities and colleges in Japan
Universities and colleges in Kagoshima Prefecture
1933 establishments in Japan
Catholic universities and colleges in Japan
Women's universities and colleges in Japan